Transmedicalism is the idea that being transgender or transsexual is contingent upon experiencing gender dysphoria; with Jessie Earl of website Pride stating "Transmedicalists believe that being transgender is contingent upon suffering and/or medical treatment." Transmedicalists believe individuals who identify as transgender, do not experience gender dysphoria, and have no desire to undergo a medical transition through methods such as hormone replacement therapy or sex reassignment surgery, are not genuinely transgender. They may also exclude those who identify themselves as non-binary from the trans label.

Transmedicalists are sometimes referred to as transmeds and truscum, a term coined by a user on microblogging website Tumblr, meaning "true transsexual scum," which has since been reappropriated. Those who believe that gender dysphoria is not required to be transgender are sometimes called tucute, meaning "too cute to be cisgender." Transmedicalists sometimes refer to those who identify as transgender without medicalized criteria as transtrenders.

Criticism of the transmedicalist perception of gender is broad and varied. Many may view transmedicalism as akin to the medical model of disability in that it medicalizes an attribute that contains both medical and social components.

See also
 Gender essentialism
 Neurosexism
 Psychic determinism
 Respectability politics

References

Transgender and medicine
LGBT politics